Marinating is the process of soaking foods in a seasoned, often acidic, liquid before cooking. The origin of the word alludes to the use of brine (aqua marina or sea water) in the pickling process, which led to the technique of adding flavor by immersion in liquid. The liquid in question, the marinade, can be either acidic (made with ingredients such as vinegar, lemon juice, or wine) or enzymatic (made with ingredients such as pineapple, papaya, yogurt, or ginger), or have a neutral pH. In addition to these ingredients, a marinade often contains oils, herbs, and spices to further flavor the food items.

It is commonly used to flavor foods and to tenderize tougher cuts of meat. The process may last seconds or days. Marinades vary between different cuisines.

Marinating is similar to brining, except that brining generally does not involve a significant amount of acid. It is also similar to pickling, except that pickling is generally done for much longer periods, primarily as a means of food preservation, whereas marinating is usually only performed for a few hours to a day, generally as a means of enhancing the flavor of the food.

Tissue breakdown

In meats, the acid causes the tissue to break down, which allows more moisture to be absorbed and results in a juicier end product; however, too much acid can be detrimental to the end product. A good marinade has a balance of acid, oil, and spice. If raw marinated meat is frozen, the marinade can break down the surface and turn the outer layer mushy.

Often confused with marinating, macerating is a similar form of food preparation.

Safety considerations

Raw pork, seafood, beef and poultry may contain harmful bacteria which may contaminate the marinade. Marinating should be done in the refrigerator to inhibit bacterial growth. Used marinade should not be made into a sauce unless rendered safe by boiling directly before use; otherwise, fresh or set-aside marinade that has not touched meat should be used.  The container used for marinating should be glass or food safe plastic. Metal, including pottery glazes which can contain lead, reacts with the acid in the marinade and should be avoided.

Cancer risk reduction
Cooking animal muscle proteins at high temperature can lead to the formation of heterocyclic amines (HCAs). According to the National Cancer Research Institute such substances present a heightened risk of cancer exposure. Marinating animal muscle proteins can reduce this risk by as much as 95% by creating a barrier to high-temperature cooking. Marination times necessary to reduce the formation of HCAs may be as short as 20 minutes.

See also

 Barbecue sauce – flavoring sauce used as a marinade, basting or topping for barbecued meat
 Ceviche – dish of marinated raw fish
 Saikyoyaki – a method of preparing fish in traditional Japanese cuisine by first marinating fish slices overnight in a white miso paste from Kyoto called saikyo shiro miso
 Vinaigrette – sauce made from oil and vinegar and commonly used as a salad dressing

References

Marinades
Cooking techniques
Culinary terminology